FC Almast, is a defunct Armenian football club from the capital Yerevan. The club was dissolved in late 1993 due to financial difficulties and is currently inactive from professional football.

League Record

References
RSSSF Armenia (and subpages per year)

Defunct football clubs in Armenia
1993 disestablishments in Armenia